Mindelheim (Swabian: Mindelhoi) is a town in Swabia, Bavaria, Germany. The town is the capital of the Unterallgäu district. At various points in history it was the chief settlement of an eponymous state.

Geography 

Other towns nearby are Memmingen and the health resorts of Bad Grönenbach, Ottobeuren and Bad Wörishofen.

Mindelheim is located close to the Autobahn 96 leading from Munich to Lindau. Furthermore, Mindelheim station is on the Buchloe–Memmingen railway, which connects to Zürich via Memmingen and Lindau and to Munich via Buchloe, and the Central Swabian Railway (Mittelschwabenbahn), which connects to Günzburg via Krumbach.

History

In 1365, the Dukes of Teck-Owen came into the possession of Mindelheim but had to sell their heritage around the castle Teck to the Counts of Württemberg. The last member of that line, Louis of Teck, Patriarch of Aquileia since 1412, died in 1439.

On 18 November 1705, John Churchill, 1st Duke of Marlborough was made Prince of Mindelheim by Joseph I, Holy Roman Emperor. Marlborough was invested at an Imperial Diet in Innsbruck on the 24 May 1706. Mindelheim had been bought by an Elector of Bavaria in the 16th century. It was confiscated from Elector Max Emmanuel in 1704 for his treachery, and effectively occupied after the Battle of Blenheim.

Marlborough had to meet the cost of investiture, which was reduced to £4,500 from the usual £12–15,000. He also avoided paying the wartime imperial tax of £6,000.

The King of Prussia, through his representative the prince of Anhalt-Dessau, moved that the title should descend successively to all the heirs of Marlborough’s body. But the princes were opposed. The lack of a male heir would prevent the Churchills becoming hereditary princes of the empire, and was essential to their agreement. Thus no special remainder was provided.

Marlborough visited Mindelheim in late May 1713, receiving princely honours from his subjects.  But the fate of the principality, and of Marlborough's effective territorial sovereignty, depended upon the ultimate peace treaty. Mindelheim was lost 1714 to the Elector of Bavaria under the Treaty of Utrecht.

Main sights 

The town center of Mindelheim reflects the typical structure of a medieval settlement. The most important municipal buildings such as the town hall or churches are arranged around a central market square.

Like many other German cities, Mindelheim used to be surrounded by a city wall. As in most cases, this wall is now incomplete as it was partially torn down in the 19th century to make room for modern buildings. Nevertheless, the remaining parts of the wall and some gates give a good impression of the original state.

Besides the old town center, the castle Mindelburg — now housing a restaurant and a publishing company — used to guard over the town in old times. The castle as well was not changed much in the last centuries. The complete annex displays the typical structure of a European fortress, including a donjon. This architectural ensemble is used to stage several festivals and markets.

Several museums and picture galleries are situated in Mindelheim as well; there is an ethnic art (Chinese, African, Arab) museum in Oberauerbach. The Schwäbisches Turmuhrenmuseum is dedicated to historic tower clocks.

Transport 

Mindelheim is served by the Buchloe–Memmingen railway.

Twin towns 
Mindelheim is twinned with several European towns:

 Bourg-de-Péage, France, since 1961
 East Grinstead, United Kingdom, since 1994
 Sant Feliu de Guixols, Spain, since 1994
 Schwaz, Austria, since 1990
 Tramin, Italy, since 1994
 Verbania, Italy, since 1994

References 
 Official website

See also 

 Principality of Mindelheim

Unterallgäu